Laurence Hall (born 26 March 1984) is an English former footballer who played for Stoke City.

Career
Hall was born in Nottingham and began his career with Stoke City. He made his professional debut on 16 October 2001 in a Football League Trophy match against Blackpool. Stoke's side featured several academy players in that match at Bloomfield Road including Kris Commons, Karl Henry, Lewis Neal, Andy Wilkinson and Brian Wilson. Speaking on his debut Hall described it as a "pleasurable experience". — "The Football League Trophy match at Blackpool was my most pleasurable game. We were 3–0 down and lost 3–2, but we could have won it". He was released by Stoke in May 2004.

Career statistics

References

English footballers
1984 births
Living people
Stoke City F.C. players
Gresley F.C. players
Matlock Town F.C. players
Association football forwards